The Samuel I. Fox Building is an historic building located at 531 Broadway in San Diego's Gaslamp Quarter, in the U.S. state of California. The Art Deco building was designed by William Templeton Johnson, and completed in 1929.

See also

 List of Gaslamp Quarter historic buildings

References

External links
 

1929 establishments in California
Art Deco architecture in California
Buildings and structures completed in 1929
Buildings and structures in San Diego
Gaslamp Quarter, San Diego